Hajji Yuseflu-ye Olya (also Romanized as Ḩājjī Yūseflu-ye ‘Olyā; also known as Ḩājjī Yūsef-e ‘Olyā and Ḩāj Yūsef-e ‘Olyā) is a village in Garmeh-ye Shomali Rural District, Kandovan District, Meyaneh County, East Azerbaijan Province, Iran. At the 2006 census, its population was 213, in 58 families.

References 

Populated places in Meyaneh County